Humberto Jorge Rosa (April 8, 1932 – September 8, 2017) was an Italian Argentine professional football player and coach. He also held Italian citizenship.

External links

1932 births
2017 deaths
Argentine footballers
Serie A players
Rosario Central footballers
U.C. Sampdoria players
Calcio Padova players
Juventus F.C. players
S.S.C. Napoli players
Argentine football managers
Calcio Padova managers
Udinese Calcio managers
Aurora Pro Patria 1919 managers
Venezia F.C. managers
Association football midfielders
Footballers from Buenos Aires